Pavani (pronounced pāvani, meaning the purifier) is a rāgam in Carnatic music (musical scale of South Indian classical music). It is the 41st melakarta rāgam in the 72 melakarta rāgam system of Carnatic music. It is called Kumbhini in Muthuswami Dikshitar school of Carnatic music.

Structure and Lakshana 

It is the 5th rāgam in the 7th chakra Rishi. The mnemonic name is Rishi-Ma. The mnemonic phrase is sa ra ga mi pa dhi nu. Its  structure is as follows (see swaras in Carnatic music for details on below notation and terms):
: 
: 

The notes used in this scale are shuddha rishabham, shuddha gandharam, prati madhyamam, chathusruthi dhaivatham and kakali nishadham. It is a sampurna rāgam – a rāgam that has all seven swaras (notes). It is the prati madhyamam equivalent of Manavati, which is the 5th melakarta scale.

Film Song

Language:Tamil

Janya rāgams 
Chandrajyoti is a janya rāgam (derived scale) that is associated with it, in which Thyagaraja has composed couple of songs. See List of janya rāgams for a full list of Pavani's janyas.

Film Song in Ragam Chandrajyoti

Language:Tamil

Compositions 

Sachidanandamaya by Muthuswami Dikshitar
Anjaade by Koteeswara Iyer
Jaya Dhanada Sakha by M. Balamuralikrishna

Related rāgams 
This section covers the theoretical and scientific aspect of this rāgam.

Pavani's notes when shifted using Graha bhedam does not yield any other melakarta. Graha bhedam is the step taken in keeping the relative note frequencies same, while shifting the shadjam to the next note in the rāgam.

This is obvious for the 6 Rishi chakra rāgams (Salagam, Jalarnavam, Jhalavarali, Navaneetam and Raghupriya being the other 5), as they have 3 missing notes between G1 and M2. Since no other swara pair in rules of melakarta rāgams have a 3 note gap, Graha bhedam yields only invalid scales within those rules.

Film Song in Ragam Pavani

Language:Tamil

Notes

References

Melakarta ragas